"Same night, same face" is Fayray's 5th single and first re-cut single. IThe song was used as the image song for the PlayStation Gamesoft "ZILL 'OLL" as well as the ending theme for the ABC/TV Asahi series program "Ninkimono de Ikou!". "No, never" was used as the ending theme for the Fuji TV program "Uhhhya~!! Hanasaka London Boots". "Sono Ai no Katachi (Pieces of that love)" was used as the ending theme for the WOWOW program "Tokyo LONBOO Tower".

Track listing
Same night, same face
No, never
その愛のかたち (Sono Ai no Katachi; Pieces of that love)

Charts 
"Same night, same face" - Oricon Sales Chart (Japan)

External links
FAYRAY OFFICIAL SITE

1999 singles
Fayray songs
1999 songs
Songs with lyrics by Akio Inoue
Songs written by Daisuke Asakura